13 Above the Night is the fourth studio album by industrial disco band My Life with the Thrill Kill Kult. It was originally released in 1993 on Interscope Records.

Recording
13 Above the Night was the band's first album for Interscope and also their first album recorded with their touring band members Levi Levi (bass), Otto Matrix (drums), Trash Kavity (guitar) and "Chicago House Diva" singer Shawn Christopher. Lydia Lunch also co-wrote and contributed vocals to the song "Dirty Little Secrets". It was recorded at Ground Control Studios and Mixed at Starlust Studios, both in Los Angeles.

Samples
On the track "Disko Fleshpot", the spoken words "Who do you think you're dealing with, some old slut on 42nd Street?" and 
"In case you didn't happen notice this, I'm one hell of a gorgeous chick!" are samples from the 1969 movie Midnight Cowboy

Release
13 Above the Night was released on cassette and digipack CD on September 7, 1993. It was later reissued with two bonus remixes on Rykodisc in 1999.

Touring
The band toured the U.S. in support of the album from October to December 1993. The support act on the 13 Above the Night Tour was Machines of Loving Grace.

Track listing

Credits
 Artwork by – Kaptain Dave
 Co-producer – Fred
 Engineer – Eric Stitt Greedy, Jay Lean
 Executive Producer – Groovie Mann, Jacky Blacque
 Guitar – Bruce Manning, Luc van Acker
 Performer – The Bomb Gang Girlz, Buzz McCoy, Groovie Mann, Jacky Blacque, Kitty Killdare, Levi Levi, Otto, Trash K.
 Producer, Written-By – Buzz McCoy
 Sampler – Gro, Miss Stress Aviv Avon*
 Vocals – Lydia Lunch, Shawn Christopher
 Written by – Groovie Mann (tracks: 1 to 3, 5 to 13)

References

External links

1993 albums
My Life with the Thrill Kill Kult albums